Ruffs Dale, also spelled Ruffsdale, is an unincorporated community in East Huntingdon Township, Westmoreland County, Pennsylvania United States. It is located approximately forty miles from Pittsburgh. Ruffs Dale has its own post office, with zip code 15679, located at 875 State Route 31.

Geography  
Buffalo Run, a tributary of Sewickley Creek, runs through Ruffs Dale.

In 1906, historian John Newton Boucher described Ruffs Dale as being located along "the South-West Branch of the Pennsylvania Railroad" between Hunker and "Tarr" (perhaps Tarrs). In 2021, railroad tracks were still in place in Ruffs Dale.

History
During the French and Indian War, the Braddock Expedition, led by General Edward Braddock and accompanied by George Washington, is said to have crossed the Big Sewickley Creek between Ruffs Dale and Paintertown, with the goal of seizing Fort Duquesne from the French.  
 
In 1896, one of the first two rural mail routes in Pennsylvania was established at the Ruffs Dale post office; the other was based in New Stanton. A historical marker was erected to commemorate the event.

Industry  
Mines once operated in the area around Ruffs Dale, according to a United States Geological Survey map dated 1987.

The S. Dillinger & Sons distillery, which produced "Dillinger Pure Rye" whisky, was located in Ruffs Dale. Constructed in 1882, it was still in operation in 1947, but was abandoned sometime prior to 1993. It was said to have been the second-largest distillery in Pennsylvania at one time.

Education 
The majority of Ruffs Dale lies within Yough School District. One school is part of Southmoreland School District.

Nearby communities 
 Hunker: 3 miles
 New Stanton: 5 miles
 Mt. Pleasant: 9 miles
 Scottdale: 7 miles
 West Newton: 8 miles
 Tarrs: 4 miles

 Yukon: 4 miles

References

Unincorporated communities in Pennsylvania
Unincorporated communities in Westmoreland County, Pennsylvania
Pittsburgh metropolitan area